Ford is a hamlet in Gloucestershire, England.

Ford lies on the B4077 road where it crosses the upper reaches of the River Windrush between Tewkesbury and Stow-on-the-Wold. The nearest village is Cutsdean a mile to its north.

External links 
 'The Plough Inn', Ford website gives more information about the area

Hamlets in Gloucestershire
Temple Guiting